Kevin Patrick Yeary is an American attorney and jurist who serves on the Texas Court of Criminal Appeals. A Republican, he was elected in 2014.

Background
Yeary has a Bachelors of Arts in English communication from St. Mary's University. He also has his Juris Doctor from St. Mary's University.

Following law school, Yeary was a briefing attorney for Judge Bill White, a former judge of the Texas Court of Criminal Appeals. From 1992 to 1995, Yeary worked as an associate attorney for Hedges & Walsh. However, he left private practice to become an assistant district attorney, where he worked in Dallas County, Harris County, and Bexar County.

Judgeship
In 2014, Yeary was elected to Place 4 on the Texas Court of Criminal Appeals as a Republican in a partisan election. According to an analysis done by Ballotpedia to determine judge partisan behavior, Yeary was labeled a "mild Republican". Texas Attorney General Ken Paxton has criticized every member of the Texas Court of Criminal Appeals except Yeary because he was the lone dissenter in a case that prohibited the state attorney general from having unilateral power to prosecute voter fraud.

References

Living people
21st-century American lawyers
St. Mary's University School of Law alumni
Texas Republicans
Judges of the Texas Court of Criminal Appeals
21st-century American judges
1966 births